The Sangu, at times called Rori (People of the Steppes), are an ethnic and linguistic group based in the Usangu Plain of Chunya District of Mbeya Region, Tanzania.  By 1907 the Sangu numbers were thought to be about 30,000.  In 1987 the Sangu population was estimated to number 75,000.

Before the coming of the Ngoni, an African group along the coast, the Southern Highlands had no political unit larger than clan chiefdom.  The clans who became known as the Sangu were probably organized into a military force in the 1830s after being attacked by outside forces.  The Sangu sent slaves and ivory to representatives of the coast and were the first to adopt the weapons, tactics, and organization of the Ngoni and began to dominate the highlands until a civil war broke out with the death of Merere I.

Hehe wars
Other groups, including the Hehe (the second to imitate the Ngoni) copied the Sangu, even taking the Sangu regimental names and language forms. 
 
Munyigumba of the Muyinga family of the Hehe people, Mkwawa's father, began to form a unified state to be called Uhehe.  It is these Hehe who in 1857 attacked the Sangu and forced them to abandon their capital of Utengule at least three times. The Sangu people repeatedly attempted to return to Utengule but failed.  They retreated westwards into Usafwa, finally forcing the Wasafwa to build a new Utengule near present-day Mbeya which was to become one of East Africa's most elaborate Bomas (A massive stone fortress, supposedly the largest in East Africa, later deliberately destroyed by the Germans.) for Merere II and his dynasty. The Hehe, recovering from their own civil war by 1879, continued their aggressive expansion and showed themselves to be more than a match for Merere II, the Sangu leader, even though the Sangu had reportedly begun using guns as early as the 1893s and had great experience in war and were noted for 'throwing their dead away' mostly into ravines.  All Sangu chiefs carried the title of Merere, whose personal name was Mwahavange. 

Sangu, Bena and Kinga are part of the Niger-Congo-Bantu people who lived in Iringa province before ivory and slave hunters Ngazija (Shia Iranian) from Comoro came. The Ngazija Iranian people are the part family of Mnyigumba Muyinga, the father of Chief Mkwawa, they hunters used Hamitic People from Ethiopia as their guide to hunt and kill an elephant at Idodi. One of the them was Mwalunyungu, Mwakilangi, Mwakiyeyeu, Mwamapenbe to catch Bantu peoples 
for carrying ivory to the ocean (Zanzibar). 

Mostly run away and hide themselves to avoid being enslaved, and rich to the deferent areas such as Usangu Basin now their call Sangu people. Others went to Ukinga Maountan, now are Kinga Peoples, followed with group who went to hide in the Bena Caves now are Wabena Manga, others went to Pangwa Mountain now are Wapangwa people, etc. This happened before Germany came. Mnyigumba forced the Bantu people now Hehe to follow their culture and religion a special the Dress Mgolole and the scuf and turban, all are similar to Iranian dress. After several years Germany came and started fighting with Mkwawa and his Hamitic. Slaver people (Hehe). This name was given by Germany after they defeated them, 
also the Germany given Vassel name as SS-Wahehe to remember them for making trouble against them.

German involvement

Merere II, having lost his homeland to the Hehe, wrote to German Governor Julius von Soden in January 1892, "I ask you to come quickly. I will show you the way...and stand by you in the war....The Hehe are gathering their men to defeat me. I beg not to leave me alone this year."  German officers were ordered to help enemies of the Wahehe and encircle Mkwawa (The M refers to a single person in Swahili). Lieutenant Tom von Prince, in early 1893, with Bauer and Wynecken, was able to offer the help requested by Merere II, promising to restore Merere to his homeland if he guarded Uhehe's western border against Mkwawa.

It still, however, took until the end of 1896 before Mkwawa was defeated in his capital, Iringa, was made an 'outlaw' and reduced to waging guerrilla war, and finally fled south and died years later (Mkwawa did not committed suicide as many scholars reported. Elders from the tribe provided the evidence that his death was faked by Germans to grolify their years of loss and that the skull sent to Germany was not Mkwawa's.)

It took until 10 December 1896 to re-install Merere III of Usangu, back in his capital of Utengule, which his father had lost 22 years earlier to the Wahehe.  Merere II had died in 1893, soon after the journal's completion, having been declared by his people as being mentally incompetent and been removed, with his son becoming successor but never, however, considered truly sovereign.  By 1907 the Wasangu numbers were thought to be about 30,000.

References

Bauer Andreus, (Raising the Flag of War) - (The Book, Raising the flag of war', is the journal of this slow encirclement of Mkwawa and his Wahehe in cooperation with the Wasangu).
Iliffe, John, (Modern History of Tamganyika)
Kotz-Kretschmer, Elise (Die Safwa) (Zweiter Band)
Willis, R., (Fipa and Related People)
Norm

Ethnic groups in Tanzania